Results from the 1992 Monaco Grand Prix Formula Three held at Monte Carlo on May 30, 1992, in the Circuit de Monaco.
The race was a support of the 1992 Monaco Grand Prix of Formula 1.

Classification

Reference 
 https://formel3guide.com/saison/saison-1991-2000/saison-1992/30-05-1992-monte-carlo.html 

Monaco Grand Prix Formula Three
Formula Three
Motorsport in Monaco